Jewels is a 1992 NBC television miniseries based on the bestselling 1992 Danielle Steel novel of the same name. Starring Annette O'Toole and Anthony Andrews, it was broadcast in two parts on October 18 and 20, 1992. The miniseries was adapted by Shelley List and Jonathan Estrin and directed by Roger Young. Jewels and its cast and crew were nominated for two Golden Globe Awards and a Primetime Emmy Award.

Cast
 Annette O'Toole as Sarah Thompson Whitfield
 Anthony Andrews as William Whitfield
 Jürgen Prochnow as Joachim von Mannheim
 Corinne Touzet as Emanuelle
 Ursula Howells as the Duchess
 Sheila Gish as Victoria Thompson
 Simon Oates as Edward Thompson
 Robert Wagner as Charles Davenport
 Bradley Cole as Freddie Van Peering
 Christopher Villiers as Phillip
 David Thwaites as Phillip, age 16
 Benedict Taylor as Julian
 Chloë Annett as Isabelle

Production
Jewels was adapted from the bestselling Danielle Steel novel of the same name by Shelley List and Jonathan Estrin, who also served as executive producers. Directed by Roger Young, the miniseries was filmed in Luxembourg.

Broadcast and reception
The five-hour miniseries was broadcast in two parts on October 18 and 20, 1992. Tony Scott of Variety called it "overblown" and wrote that "Jewels barely reaches above pulp". Finding O'Toole, Andrews and Prochnow unremarkable, Scott complimented Villiers' and Taylor's "surprising vitality" as the Whitfield sons and also praised Howells, Gish and Oates as William and Sarah's parents.

Award nominations
Jewels was nominated for a Golden Globe Award for Best Mini-Series or Motion Picture Made for TV and Andrews was nominated for a Golden Globe for Best Performance by an Actor in a Mini-Series or Motion Picture Made for TV. Composer Patrick Williams won a Primetime Emmy Award for Outstanding Individual Achievement in Music Composition for a Miniseries or a Special for Part I.

References

External links
 

1992 television films
1992 films
1990s American television miniseries
Television shows based on American novels
Films based on works by Danielle Steel
Films directed by Roger Young
Films scored by Patrick Williams
NBC Productions films
NBC network original films